Gindie is a rural locality in the Central Highlands Region, Queensland, Australia.

Geography 
The town of Fernlees is located in southern Gindie.

The Gregory Highway passes through the locality from north (Emerald) to south (Minerva) passing through the town of Fernlees. The Blackwater railway line passes through the locality parallel and immediately east of the highway with a railway siding at Fernlees.

History

The name Gindie means "much brigalow".

Gindie Provisional School (also known as Gindie Siding Provisional School) opened 12 November 1897, becoming Gindie State School on 1 January 1909. The school closed in 1949 but later reopened.

The Gindie State Farm was established In 1898 to experiment with growing new kinds of crops in the district such as sorghum, maize and pumpkins. The farm closed in 1932.

Fernlees State School opened on 20 September 1951 and closed in 1953. It was on a  site off to the west the Gregory Highway north of the town (approx ).

Fernlees Methodist Church was established in 1959 at 2780 Gregory Highway. Following the amalgamation of the Methodist Church into the Uniting Church in Australia in 1977, it became the Fernlees Uniting Church. It closed in 2007. It is now a private residence.

On 17 April 2020, the Queensland Government re-drew the boundaries of localities within the Central Highlands Region by replacing the locality of The Gemfields with three new localities of Rubyvale, Sapphire Central and Anakie Siding (around the towns of Rubyvale, Sapphire, and Anakie respectively). As a consequence of these changes, Lake Maraboon is now entirely within the north-west of Gindie and the boundary between Lochington and Minerva/Gindie more closely follows the course of the Nogoa River.

Education
Gindie State School is a government primary (Prep-6) school for boys and girls at the corner of Old Cullen-la-ringo Road and the Gregory Highway. In 2013, the school had an enrolment of 40 students in two classes, P-2 and 3-7, with 3 teachers (2 full-time equivalent). In 2018, the school had an enrolment of 35 students with 4 teachers (3 full-time equivalent) and 8 non-teaching staff (2 full-time equivalent).

Camp Fairbairn Outdoor Education Centre is an Outdoor and Environmental Education Centre at Fairbairn Dam. It has a principal, 3 teachers and 3 non-teaching staff. It offers basic residential accommodation and outdoor programs for students from Prep to Year 12.

There is no secondary school in Gindie. The nearest secondary school is Emerald State High School in neighbouring Emerald to the north.

References

Further reading

External links 

 

Central Highlands Region
Localities in Queensland